Street King is the sixth studio album by American hip hop recording artist Trae tha Truth. It was released on July 12, 2011, via ABN Entertainment and Prez Entertainment. The album follows his 2008 release of The Beginning. Trae speaks in the album for Hip Hop at Lunch saying: "This album became an instant classic. I was down for what I was going, to be banned from this shit and then I was not even focused on music".

Singles 
Trae released two singles, "Getting Paid", which features vocals from rapper Wiz Khalifa, and production by V-Don, was released on June 7, 2011, to help in the promotion of Street King. The second single of Street King is "I'm On" that features vocal-contributions from rappers Lupe Fiasco, Wale, Wiz Khalifa, Big Boi & MDMA and production by CyFyre. In February 2012 Trae released "I'm on 2.0" that features vocal-contributions from rappers Big K.R.I.T., Jadakiss, J. Cole, Kendrick Lamar, B.o.B, Tyga, Gudda Gudda, Bun B and Mark Morrison. The album has sold over 20,000 copies on its own.

Track listing
Track list confirmed by HipHopDX, and production by Screw Heads Only.

Charts

References 

2011 albums
Trae tha Truth albums
Albums produced by Drumma Boy